Julu may refer to:

 Julu Commandery (鉅鹿郡), within present-day Xingtai Prefecture, Hebei
 Julu County (Han Dynasty) (鉅鹿縣), now Pingxiang County, Xingtai, Hebei
 Julu (ancient town) (巨鹿), now in Pingxiang County, Xingtai, Hebei
 Battle of Julu
 Julu (modern town) (巨鹿镇), in Julu County, Xingtai, Hebei
 Julu County (巨鹿县), a present-day county in Xingtai, Hebei